Laguna City is a large-scale private-housing estates built in Sai Tso Wan, Kwun Tong District, in eastern Kowloon, Hong Kong. It was developed jointly by Cheung Kong Holdings and Hutchison Whampoa Property and completed in the early 1990s. The estate is also home to Laguna City Football Club and Laguna Gully Cricket Club.

Location
Laguna City is built along Lam Tin's waterfront. Part of Laguna City is built on reclaimed land. The development is adjacent to Cha Kwo Ling Village, one of the last squatter villages in Hong Kong.

History
In the late 1980s, Cheung Kong acquired two pieces of land in Lam Tin, one being a former Shell oil depot, now the Laguna City, the other above the newly built Lam Tin MTR station and bus terminus, which was developed into the Sceneway Garden respectively. Laguna City was completed in 1991 and Sceneway Garden was completed in 1992.

Description
Laguna City consists of four phases, totalling 38 towers at its 1991 completion. There are 3 private roads in Laguna City, which are Laguna Street in phase 1 and 4, Laguna Street East in phase 2 and Laguna Street South in phase 3. Phases 1, 2 and 4 of Laguna City are managed by the same company, while phase 3 has an independent management authority. Similarly, Phases 1, 2 and 4 share an owners' committee, whereas Phase 3 has its own. Census data indicate that Laguna City had a population of 23,354 in 2011.

Built together with Laguna City was Laguna Park, which was completed in 1994 and then handed over to the Urban Council, now the Leisure and Cultural Services Department. Laguna Park has a total area of 30,000 sq m (320,000 ft²).

Facilities
 3 shopping centres, which are Laguna Plaza, Centre de Laguna and Laguna Arcade.
 2 resident club house
 1 park
 a few children playgrounds and jogging trails
 1 pet park located near Laguna City in Kwun Tong Ferry Pier Square.
 5 tennis court
 2 basketball court
 1 soccer pitch
 1 public transport interchange with 3 bus routes and 2 minibus routes.
 2 kindergartens
 Hong Kong Public Libraries mobile library Laguna City stop (Next to Laguna City Clubhouse 1)

Education
Laguna City is in Primary One Admission (POA) School Net 48. Within the school net are multiple aided schools (operated independently but funded with government money) and Kwun Tong Government Primary School.

Covid Pandemic
Blocks 5 and 7 of Laguna City were put under a coronavirus lockdown at 7pm on 31 January 2021, until 1 February.

See also
 South Horizons, a private housing estate at Ap Lei Chau, was built from 1991 to 1995 by Hutchison Whampoa, partially on the former site of a Shell oil depot.
 Sceneway Garden, a private housing estate next to Laguna City, both connected by the Lam Tin MTR station.

References

External links

 Emporis entry
 S.K. Hui, A. Cheung, J. Pang, "A Hierarchical Bayesian Approach for Residential Property Valuation:Application to Hong Kong Housing Market", International Real Estate Review, 2010 Vol. 13 No.1: pp. 1–29

New Kowloon
Private housing estates in Hong Kong
CK Hutchison Holdings